Clarence C. Caldwell (February 2, 1877 – October 4, 1957) was an American attorney and the 9th Attorney General of South Dakota.

Early life and education
Clarence Carey Caldwell born in Minnehaha County, Dakota Territory on February 2, 1877. He was raised in Minnehaha County, and graduated from Sioux Falls High School. He attended South Dakota State University and graduated in 1902 with his BA. He received his LL.B. from the University of South Dakota School of Law in 1906 after initially attending the University of Chicago Law School. Caldwell was the principal of Vermillion High School for 3 years following is graduation from the University of South Dakota.

Legal career
Caldwell was state's attorney of Miner County from 1907 to 1908 and 1911 to 1914. He was elected the 9th Attorney General of South Dakota in 1914. After leaving office he established a law practice in Sioux Falls in partnership with his brother Charles V. Caldwell. Caldwell later practiced in partnership with Roy D. Burns, who went on to serve as a judge of the circuit court.

Death
Caldwell died on October 4, 1957. He was buried at Woodlawn Cemetery in Sioux Falls, South Dakota.

Family
In 1908, Caldwell married Marie Bryant. They were the parents of a son and a daughter.

References

External links

1877 births
1957 deaths
20th-century American lawyers
People from Minnehaha County, South Dakota
South Dakota Attorneys General
South Dakota Republicans
University of South Dakota School of Law alumni